The following is an episode list for the German television series Derrick. There were a total of 281 episodes aired originally on ZDF (in Germany), ORF (in Austria) and SRG (in Switzerland) between 20 October 1974 and 16 October 1998 (25 seasons). The show was about Chief Inspector (Oberinspektor) Stephan Derrick (Horst Tappert) and his loyal assistant Inspector (Kriminalhauptmeister) Harry Klein (Fritz Wepper), who solve murder cases in Munich and surroundings. Here you also find the actors of each episode of Derrick.

Season 1, 1974

Season 2, 1975

Season 3, 1976

Season 4, 1977

Season 5, 1978

Season 6, 1979

Season 7, 1980

Season 8, 1981

Season 9, 1982

Season 10, 1983

Season 11, 1984

Season 12, 1985

Season 13, 1986

Season 14, 1987

Season 15, 1988

Season 16, 1989

Season 17, 1990

Season 18, 1991

Season 19, 1992

Season 20, 1993

Season 21, 1994

Season 22, 1995

Season 23, 1996

Season 24, 1997

Season 25, 1998

Notes

External links 
derrick-database
IMDB
derrick-fan.blogspot.com 
Derrick Fanclub 
Derrick-Lexikon 
EPisodeWorld 
fernsehserien.de 
filmportal.de 
 https://horsttappert.com/ Italian Official Site dedicated to the actor Horst Tappert

Lists of crime television series episodes